The Bay of St Michel is a 1963 British film directed by John Ainsworth.

It was also known as Operation Mermaid.

Premise
A trio of World War 2 veterans reunite to search for a lost Nazi fortune.

Cast
Keenan Wynn
Mai Zetterling
Ronald Howard
Rona Anderson
Trader Faulkner

See also
Mont-Saint-Michel

References

External links

The Bay of St Michel at BFI

1963 films
British adventure films
1960s British films